Posidonia is a genus of seagrasses.

"Posidonia" may also refer to:

Posidonia (band), an Italian band, formed in Turin
Paestum, a Greek city in Italy, sometimes called "Posidonia" or "Poseidonia"
Poseidonia or Posidonia, a village on the island of Syros (Greece)
Posidonia Shale, a geological formation from the Lower Jurassic
Posidonia an extinct genus of ostreoidean bivalve from the Paleozoic and Mesozoic

See also

 
 Poseidonia (disambiguation)
 Poseidon (disambiguation)
 Posidon